The Andalusian cadence (diatonic phrygian tetrachord) is a term adopted from flamenco music for a chord progression comprising four chords descending stepwise – a iv–III–II–I progression with respect to the Phrygian mode or i–VII–VI–V progression with respect to the Aeolian mode (minor). It is otherwise known as the minor descending tetrachord. Traceable back to the Renaissance, its effective sonorities made it one of the most popular progressions in classical music.

The Andalusian cadence can be regarded as a modulation between the Phrygian mode of a Major parent scale and the Phrygian Dominant mode of a Harmonic Minor scale, e.g. E, F, G (phrygian) or G  (phrygian dominant), A, B, C, D.

Despite the name it is not a true cadence (i.e., occurring only once, when ending a phrase, section, or piece of music); it is most often used as an ostinato (repeating over and over again). It is heard in rock songs such as "Runaway" by Del Shannon.

Origins

A popular melodic pattern of Ancient Greece offers a possible starting point for the Andalusian cadence. Called the Diatonic tetrachord, the sequence resembles the bass line of the chord progression developed centuries later. Some theorists consider that the same structure may have occurred earlier in Judah. A sequence more or less close to the Greek tetrachord structure might have been known to the Moors in Southern Spain and spread from there through Western Europe. The French troubadours were influenced by the Spanish music.

The Andalusian cadence known today, using triads, may not have occurred earlier than the Renaissance, though the use of parallel thirds or sixths was evident as early as the 13th century. One of the earliest uses of this chord sequence is seen in Claudio Monteverdi's choral work, Lamento della Ninfa. The piece begins in A minor and clearly uses the cadence pattern as a basso ostinato, resulting in Amin – Emin – Fmaj – E7. This work was first published in the Eighth Book of Madrigals (1638).

The progression resembles the first four measures of the 15th century Passamezzo antico; i – VII – i – V. The use of the VI chord may suggest a more recent origin than the Passamezzo antico since the cadences i – VII and VII – i were popular in the late Middle Ages and early Renaissance, (see also double tonic) while VII – VI arose as a result of advancement in music theory. However, the absence of the leading tone from the VII chord suggests that the progression originated before the tonal system in the modal approach of the time of Palestrina, where the tonic must be approached from chord V whereas typical Baroque style would have avoided the flat VII and introduced dominant chords (VII or V chords, to form cadences resolving upon an "i" chord).

Analysis

Melody
A minor seventh would be added to the dominant "V" chord to increase tension before resolution (V7–i). The roots of the chords belong to a modern phrygian tetrachord (the equivalent of a Greek Dorian tetrachord, the latter mentioned above), that is to be found as the upper tetrachord of a natural minor scale (for A minor, they are: A G F E).

A remarkable fact about tetrachords was noticed since the Ancient times and rediscovered in early Renaissance: when a tetrachord features a semitone (half-step) between two of its tones, it is the semitone that will determine the melodic tendency of the given tetrachord or mode (when combining tetrachords). If the semitone falls between the highest two steps, the melody tends to be ascending (e.g. major scales); a semitone between the lowest tones in the tetrachord involves a melody "inclined" to descend. This said, the Phrygian tetrachord, borrowed from traditional music of Eastern Europe and Anatolia, is to be found also in the Andalusian cadence and sets the mentioned character (the semitone falls between [the roots of] V and VI).

Modal vs. tonal

A rigorous analysis should note that many chord progressions are likely to date back from an epoch prior to early Baroque (usually associated with birth of tonality). In such cases (also, that of the Andalusian cadence), explanations offered by tonality "neglect" the history and evolution of the chord progression in question. This is because harmonic analyses in tonal style use only two scales (major and minor) when explaining origins of chord moves. In exchange, the luxuriant modal system (i.e., the entirety of musical modes ever created and their specific harmonies – if existing) offers various plausible origins and explanations for every chord move. However, most classical (Baroque or subsequent) and popular music which makes use of the given chord progression might treat it itself in a tonal manner.

A number of musicians and theorists (including renowned guitarist Manolo Sanlúcar) consider the Andalusian cadence as a chord progression built upon the Phrygian mode. Since tonality took the first chord in the progression for a tonic ("i"), the Phrygian notation (modal) of the cadence writes as following: iv – III – II – I (or, more commonly, but less correctly, iv – III – II – I). Though tonal functions have little in common with the Phrygian mode, the four chords could be roughly equalized. (The Phrygian mode is like a natural minor with step two lowered; however, step three switches between major and minor third, an equivalent to the subtonic/leading tone conflict in the tonal acceptation.) Thus, the "iv" corresponds to a subdominant chord, while "III" is the mediant and "I" is the tonic. The "II" chord has a dominant function, and may be thought of as a tritone substitution of "V", i.e., the Neapolitan sixth chord. (The only purpose for highlighting these "functions" is to compare between the modal and tonal views of the cadence. The mode involved in the cadence is not a pure Phrygian, but one whose third step occurs in both instances, minor and major third. This is unacceptable in tonality; hence, tonal functions cannot be used. A common mistake occurs when the given mode is thought of as major, given that the tonic chord is major. However, the Phrygian mode features a minor third and the "I" chord may be taken for a borrowed chord, i.e., a Picardy third.)

When the VI chord, which may be added between III and II (iv–III–VI–II–I) and cadenced upon, is the most characteristic contrasting tonal area, similar by analogy to the relative major of a minor key.

Another modification gives the progression a more characteristically modal sound by simply replacing the VII with a vii chord. This alters the progression slightly; Amin – Gmin – Fmaj – E7. It can be found in "Chanela", by DiMeola / McLaughlin / De Lucia. Although this example is in the key of B minor, the applied principle is the same.

Harmonic peculiarities
The tonal system sets three main functions for the diatonic tertian chords: tonic (T), dominant (D) and subdominant (SD). Any sequence through different functions is allowed (e.g. T→D, SD→D), except for D→SD. A tonal scale's degrees are as following: "I" and "VI" are tonic chords (of which, "I" is stronger; all final cadences end in "I"), "V" and "VII" are dominants (both feature the leading tone and "V" is more potent), "IV" and "II" are subdominant chords ("IV" is stronger). ("III" isn't given a precise function, although it may replace a dominant in some cases.) All sequences between same-function chords, from the weaker member to the stronger (e.g. VII – V), are forbidden. When using the natural minor, dominant chords exchange their leading tone for a subtonic; as a result, their dominant quality is strongly undermined.

A tonal insight on the Andalusian cadence leads to considering the "VII" a local exception: the subtonic it uses for a root should be, however, re-replaced by the leading tone before returning to "i". (The leading tone is heard in the "V" chord, as the chord's major third.) A "VII" would leave the dominant category (compare: "VII") and start acting to the contrary. That is, a "VII" chord would now prefer moving to a subdominant rather than to a tonic chord. Yet, the Andalusian cadence brings about a limit condition for tonal harmony, with a VII – VI chord move.

The Andalusian is an authentic cadence, because a dominant chord ("V") comes just before the tonic "i". (Using modal harmonies, the third, and not the fourth chord – "II" – acts as the dominant, substituted to tritone. Even so, the cadence stays authentic. The fourth chord itself is the tonic, so the cadence need not return to the tonal tonic, i.e. modal "iv".)

Denominations in flamenco music

Basic keys
The standard tuning in guitars causes most flamenco music to be played only in a few keys. Of those, the most popular are A minor and D minor (equivalent to E and A Phrygian, respectively). They are as follows:
 por arriba, which corresponds to A minor, where an Andalusian cadence consists of the chord progression Am – G – F – E
 por medio names the D minor key, in which the Andalusian cadence is built from a Dm – C – B – A progression

Derivative keys
Using a capotasto or scordature, other keys can be obtained, mainly derived from the two basic keys. Flamenco guitarist Ramón Montoya and singer Antonio Chacón were among the first to use the new keys, which have distinctive names:

Music examples featuring Andalusian cadences

Popular music

Songs of the early 1960s, such as the Ventures' 1960 hit "Walk, Don't Run", used the bass structure from the iconic Andalusian cadence for a surf rock hit; however, the first chord is A Major not A minor as is a common misconception about the song. Other notable examples from popular music are "Stray Cat Strut", "Good Vibrations", "All Along the Watchtower", "Like a Hurricane" "Happy Together", "California Dreamin", and "Sultans of Swing".

The Andalusian cadence is featured in the chorus of Michael Jackson's "Smooth Criminal", and it also builds the basis for the middle section in Paco de Lucía's signature track, "Entre dos Aguas", where this progression is played in the key of E minor.

In addition, the I–VII–VI–V chord progression is the primary structure of "Hit the Road Jack".

Altered progressions
Reordered or repeated chords
"California Dreamin'" (1965) by The Mamas & the Papas, where two chords have changed places: i (– i2) – VI – VII – V. (Note: the "i2" notation represents a tonic chord whose seventh falls in the bass; a "" notation suggests a suspended chord resolving to a triad)
Foreign chords, bassline unchanged
Progression by fourths or the addition of VI between III and II: Am–G7–C–F–E or iv–III7–VI–II–I.
Dominant chord substituted
A most unusual way of altering the cadence can be heard in Pink Floyd's "Comfortably Numb" (1979), where the "V" chord is skipped for a "iv". It is as follows: i – VII – VI (– VI2) – iv (and back to "i"). The resulting progression is on the edge between tonal and modal, where the subtonic doesn't change back into a leading-tone, but the obtained cadence is suitable for tonality (called plagal or backdoor).

Modern usage
The integration of the traditional Andalusian cadence and Renaissance-style practices of musical composition and song are evident in modern musical genres such as rock and pop. Flamenco music, a style of music and dance that was popularized in the Andalusian regions of Spain, has also been incorporated into modern pop and rock music. Specific examples include the usage of the cadence in "La leyenda del tiempo" by Camarón de la Isla. Other recent uses of the cadence are apparent in flamenco inspired rock songs such as "Ya no me asomo de la reja", 'La que vive en la Carrera", and the bassline of "Negras las intenciones".

See also
Lament bass
ii–V–I progression
Flamenco mode
List of popular music songs featuring Andalusian cadences

References

Cadences
Chord progressions